"Tachanka", sometimes labelled "Song of the Tachanka" is a Soviet revolutionary song from the late interwar period, composed by Konstantin Listov and written by Mikhail Ruderman in 1937. It describes an unnamed battle in the Russian Civil War and the Tachankas, or machine-gun carts, that were used by the Red Army at the time. The song underwent several lyrical changes over the years, and features in the repertoire of the Red Army Choir and Leon Lishner.

Lyrics

1The reference to the Red cavalry is replaced in some versions with the line "near the sea of Azov" (transliterated: Priazovskaya tachanka)

2The reference to the Komsomol is dropped in some versions and replaced with the line "Tachanka from Ukraine" (transliterated: Ukrainskaya tachanka).

References

Soviet songs
1937 songs
Russian Civil War